Shahrekord University of Medical Sciences (SKUMS) is a university in Shahrekord, the capital of the Chaharmahal and Bakhtiari Province of Iran.

Educational hospitals

 Ayatollah Kashani Hospital
 Hajar Hospital
 Vali-Asr Hospital

See also
 Higher education in Iran
 Chahar Mahal and Bakhtiari
 Shahrekord County

External links
Official website

Universities in Iran
Medical schools in Iran
Education in Chaharmahal and Bakhtiari Province
Buildings and structures in Chaharmahal and Bakhtiari Province

1986 establishments in Iran
Educational institutions established in 1986